The 1986 European Super Cup was played between Steaua București and Dynamo Kyiv, with Steaua winning 1–0. The winning goal was scored by Gheorghe Hagi.

Match

Details

See also
FC Dynamo Kyiv in European football
FC Steaua București in European football

References
General

Specific

External links
 UEFA Super Cup

Super Cup
1986
Super Cup 1986
European Super Cup 1986
1986 in Monégasque sport
Supercup
Super
International club association football competitions hosted by Monaco
Super Cup